The Eight Bells is a pub in Fulham High Street, close to the northern end of Putney Bridge.

The Eight Bells was the site of an early dog show, with a toy spaniel show in 1851.

In 1886, the original wooden Fulham Bridge was replaced by Putney Bridge to the west, and the Eight Bells received compensation for the loss of trade, as that end of Fulham High Street now became a quiet cul-de-sac.

From 1886 to 1888, Fulham Football Club used the pub as a changing room, as they played at the nearby Ranelagh House until that site was used for housing.

In 1986, Kenneth Erskine, the Hammersmith-born serial killer known as the Stockwell Strangler, raped and strangled his final victim, Florence Tisdall, an 83-year-old widow around the corner in Ranelagh Gardens Mansions, but any cries for help would have been drowned out by a disco at the Eight Bells to celebrate the wedding of Prince Andrew and Sarah Ferguson.

References

Fulham
Pubs in the London Borough of Hammersmith and Fulham